The 1898 Utah Agricultural Aggies football team was an American football team that represented Utah Agricultural College (later renamed Utah State University) during the 1898 college football season. In their first and only season, under head coach Samuel Dunning, the Aggies compiled a 0–1 record.

The players on the 1898 team included Orval Adams, Irwin Allred, and J.L. Kearns.

Schedule

References

Utah Agricultural
Utah State Aggies football seasons
College football winless seasons
Utah Agricultural Aggies football